Ophidiomorpha is a clade composed of snakes and their primitive and early relatives proposed by Palci and Caldwell (2007) The clade was defined as a node-based clade containing the most recent common ancestor of dolichosaurs, adriosaurs, Aphanizocnemus, and fossil and extant Ophidia and all of its descendants.

The existence of Ophidiomorpha as a clade may become problematic as it is placed within the Pythonomorpha, a clade that itself is not universally agreed upon containing mosasaurs and snakes, their most recent common ancestor and all of its descendants. Indeed, most 20th-century herpetologists and paleontologists rejected this idea and sought instead to demonstrate a close relationship between mosasaurs and varanid lizards.

Pythonomorpha was later resurrected by a number of paleontologists (Lee, 1997; Caldwell et Lee, 1997) who had conducted cladistic analyses that seemed to show that snakes and mosasaurs may have been more closely related to one another than either were to the varanid lizards, and that snakes more likely arose from aquatic ancestors.

References 

Anguimorpha